The Round Barn near Lima, Ohio, United States, is a round barn that was built in 1911.  It was listed on the National Register of Historic Places in 1980.

It may have been known also as Isaac Rozell Round Barn.

References

Barns on the National Register of Historic Places in Ohio
Buildings and structures in Allen County, Ohio
National Register of Historic Places in Allen County, Ohio
Infrastructure completed in 1911
Round barns in Ohio